Friedrich Ritter Bömches von Boor (27 December 1916 – 2 May 2010) was a German painter, graphic artist and photographer.

Life
The son of an old-established Transylvanian Saxon family, Friedrich von Bömches was born in Braşov at a time when Transylvania was still part of Austria-Hungary. In 1938, he was drafted in the Romanian Army, and marched with it up to Stalingrad. Von Bömches was demobbed in 1945, but as a German he was deported to the Soviet Union by occupying forces shortly after, and was forced to work in Ukrainian quarries until 1950.

In 1974 von Bömches relocated to the Federal Republic of Germany and four years later finally found  - with the assistance of a local factory owner - a new home at Wiehl, a small town in North Rhine-Westphalia. Here, the artist lives together with his wife Erna (married since 1945) and still responds to his unbowed creative urge, though evidently limited by a severe heart surgery performed in 2001.

Work
Friedrich von Bömches has been highly successful in sublimating his bitter experiences with war and captivity. He took up this artistic transformation using the medium of photography: during the Stalingrad campaign von Bömches created a lot of photographs (most of which have additional documentary value).

Not allowed to engage in this art throughout his captivity, von Bömches compensated by resorting to drawing. To date, von Bömches has produced again and again his famous Sekundenskizzen ("instant sketches") - he admitted to be suffering from a "hysterical pencil addiction". Nonetheless, a large portion of his post-release works deal with the tragedy of human existence, death (including his heralds that age and decay), hunger und persecution - to some extent in biblical or mythological moods.  In "trapping" the living through the contemplation of such seeming opposites as Life and Death, he provides equal motifs: masterly portraits thanks to an outstanding power of observation, as well as many "little" pictures, most of them extempore, with animal and other themes.

The German connoisseur and patron of arts Peter Ludwig (1925–1996) referred to von Bömches as the "probably greatest portraitist of the present".

Between 1950 and 1974, he created some fifteen thousand works. None of them were taken out of Romania. The number of his creations in Germany probably reaches a similar number, including his portraits of notable persons (more than five hundred in number).

Paintings and drawings (selection of the late work)
 Tell Me where the Flowers Are (Sag mir, wo die Blumen sind), acrylic, 1990
 The Ferryman (Der Fährmann), mid-1990s
 The Embarrassing Guest (Der unangenehme Gast), mid-1990s
 Terminus (Endstation), mid-1990s
 There Is No Way Back (Es gibt kein Zurück), mid-1990s
 The Endless Way (Der unendliche Weg), mid-1990s
 Pietà, mid-1990s
 Crucifixion (Kreuzigung), mid-1990s
 Funeral Cortege in Romania (Trauerzug in Rumänien), mid-1990s
 People Left Behind (Die Zurückgelassenen), charcoal, 1994
 Nursing Home (Altenheim), 1995
 Behind Barbwire (Hinter Stacheldraht), mixed media, 1999
 Trip in the Dark (Fahrt ins Ungewisse) (Trilogy: Day / Night / The Door Opens), mixed media, 2001

Notabilities' portraits (selection)
 Berthold Beitz, chairman of the supervisory board at Krupp
 Hans-Dietrich Genscher
 Martin Heidegger
 Philipp Jenninger, speaker of the Federal Diet of Germany (1984–88)
 Lore Lorentz (1920–1994), Grande Dame of German cabaret
 Peter Ludwig (1925–1996), German connoisseur and patron of arts
 Hermann Oberth
 Herbert Quandt
 Horst Waffenschmidt (1933–2002), German politician

Exhibitions in Germany (selection)
 1966 / 1974: Aachen, Suermondt-Ludwig-Museum
 1985: Bonn - Bad Godesberg (Muffendorf), Altes Kelterhaus
 1998: Burzenland - Artist's Land, Dinkelsbühl, parish house St. Paul
 2001: Hommage à Friedrich von Bömches, Wiehl, lobby of savings bank
 2002: The Way to Stalingrad (photographies), Berlin, Romanian Institute of Culture / Banishment, Nümbrecht, Homburg castle
 2005: Pictures from the Gulag, Ulm, Donauschwäbisches Zentralmuseum / Lost Years, Stolberg-Vicht, Europäischer Kunsthof
 2007: Gundelsheim, Baden-Württemberg, Transylvanian Museum at Horneck Castle
 Durable exhibition at Gummersbach, Kreishaus

Tributes
Friedrich von Bömches received several awards for his life's work:
 In Romania (Merit Cultural)
 In Ohio, United States
 In Germany (1987: Federal Cross of Merit, 2002: Schwarzenberger Hochzeitstaler in Gold )

Literature
 Friedrich von Bömches: Malerei und Grafik, 1992, 
 Friedrich von Bömches: Leben und Schicksal, 1996, 
 Veröffentlichungen des Südostdeutschen Kulturwerks: Reihe A, Kultur und Dichtung; Bd. 52, 1997,

See also
 List of German painters

References

1916 births
2010 deaths
People from Brașov
Transylvanian Saxon people
German people of German-Romanian descent
German Expressionist painters
20th-century German painters
20th-century German male artists
German male painters
21st-century German painters
21st-century German male artists
Romanian painters
Officers Crosses of the Order of Merit of the Federal Republic of Germany
Romanian military personnel of World War II
Romanian emigrants to Germany